Samarsky is a rural locality (a settlement) in Rybinsky Selsoviet, Kamensky District, Altai Krai, Russia. The population was 90 as of 2013. There are 4 streets.

Geography 
Samarsky is located 40 km south of Kamen-na-Obi (the district's administrative centre) by road. Rybnoye is the nearest rural locality.

References 

Rural localities in Kamensky District, Altai Krai